Rafaela Zanellato (born 25 November 1999) is a Brazilian rugby sevens player. She competed in the women's tournament at the 2020 Summer Olympics.

References

External links
 

1999 births
Living people
Female rugby sevens players
Olympic rugby sevens players of Brazil
Rugby sevens players at the 2020 Summer Olympics
Pan American Games competitors for Brazil
Rugby sevens players at the 2019 Pan American Games
Brazilian female rugby union players
Brazil international women's rugby sevens players
Brazilian rugby sevens players